Cerebral dopamine neurotrophic factor also known as ARMET-like protein 1 is a protein that in humans is encoded by the CDNF gene.

References

Further reading

External links